Ahmadpur is a Village, Village Council in the Ambala district of the Indian state of Haryana. According to a census taken in 2011, the population of the village was 600.

References

Villages in Ambala district
Ambala district